Citra is a free and open-source emulator of the handheld Nintendo 3DS for Windows, macOS, Linux, and Android. Citra's name is derived from CTR, which is the model name of the original 3DS. Citra can run many homebrew games and commercial games.

Citra was first made available in 2014. The core team behind it went on to develop Nintendo Switch emulator yuzu in 2018.

Development 
Citra was initially created in April 2014. The first commercial Nintendo 3DS game to be run by Citra was The Legend of Zelda: Ocarina of Time 3D.

Citra can emulate audio since May 21, 2016, and has had a JIT compiler since September 15, 2016. In November 2017, Citra announced networking support for the emulator. The networking support emulates the 3DS's local Wi-Fi, which originally made it possible to play over local networks. Additionally, Citra allows the networking to be compatible with other users anywhere. In April 2020, the Citra Team announced compatibility with New Nintendo 3DS games and support for save states, and in May 2020, they announced a version of Citra for Android.

See also 

 List of computer system emulators
 Video game console emulator

External links 
 Citra website
 Game compatibility list

References

Android emulation software
Free and open-source software
Free video game console emulators
Nintendo 3DS
Nintendo emulators